Sylvester Quayle Cannon (June 10, 1877 – May 29, 1943) was an American businessman, engineer, and religious leader who served as the sixth presiding bishop of the Church of Jesus Christ of Latter-day Saints (LDS Church) from 1925 to 1938 and a member of church's Quorum of the Twelve Apostles from 1939 until his death. He was the son of George Q. Cannon, an apostle and member of the church's First Presidency.

Biography
Cannon was born in Salt Lake City, Utah Territory. He studied at the University of Utah and then at the Massachusetts Institute of Technology, where he received a B.S. degree in mining engineering.

In 1899, Cannon began an LDS Church mission in Belgium. Cannon then served from 1900 to 1902 as president of the church's Netherlands–Belgium Mission. Cannon also served as Francis M. Lyman's secretary on a three-month trip to many nations along the Mediterranean and in the Middle East.

From 1916 to 1925, Cannon served as president of the Pioneer Stake in Salt Lake City.

In 1925, Cannon became the Presiding Bishop of the LDS Church, succeeding Charles W. Nibley. Cannon's counselors were David A. Smith and John Wells.

In 1938, Cannon was released as Presiding Bishop and was succeeded by LeGrand Richards. At the same time, Cannon was ordained an apostle and made an "associate" of the Quorum of the Twelve Apostles, a unique position that had never been filled before. When Quorum member Melvin J. Ballard died the next year, Cannon became a full member of the Quorum; he served in this position until his death.

Cannon died in Salt Lake City from encephalomalacia, or softening of the brain. He was buried at Salt Lake City Cemetery.

See also
 Council on the Disposition of the Tithes

Notes

References

External links
Grampa Bill's G.A. Pages: Sylvester Q. Cannon
 Sylvester Q. Cannon letter, MSS SC 2594 at L. Tom Perry Special Collections, Harold B. Lee Library, Brigham Young University

1877 births
1943 deaths
19th-century Mormon missionaries
20th-century Mormon missionaries
American Mormon missionaries in Belgium
American Mormon missionaries in the Netherlands
American general authorities (LDS Church)
American people of Manx descent
Apostles (LDS Church)
Burials at Salt Lake City Cemetery
Cannon family
Clergy from Salt Lake City
Latter Day Saints from Massachusetts
Latter Day Saints from Utah
MIT School of Engineering alumni
Mission presidents (LDS Church)
People from Salt Lake City
Presiding Bishops (LDS Church)
University of Utah alumni